QBS, was the second official sub-group of South Korean girl group, T-ara. It was formed in 2013 and is based in Japan. The sub-group consisted of three members: Boram, Qri and Soyeon.

History
In April 2013, T-ara's agency Core Contents Media formed a South Korean sub-group T-ara N4 consisting of members Eunjung, Areum, Jiyeon and Hyomin. Shortly after, it was announced that T-ara would form a Japanese sub-unit called QBS, consisting of the remaining members. The sub-group focuses on the Japanese market, and released their debut single  on June 26, 2013.

Discography

Singles

References

 
MBK Entertainment artists
Musical groups established in 2013
Musical groups from Seoul
South Korean girl groups
2013 establishments in South Korea